Graham Nolan (born March 12, 1962) is an American comic book artist, best known for work for DC Comics on Batman-related titles in the 1990s and his work on The Phantom Sunday strip. He frequently collaborates with writer Chuck Dixon.

Biography
Nolan's first comics credit came in April 1985, when his work appeared in DC Comics' Talent Showcase #16, alongside Eric Shanower and Stan Woch (among others). Moving on to an issue of the Marvel Transformers comic, in 1988 he started a 12-issue run on DC's Power of the Atom comic. In June 1990, he launched John Ostrander and Tim Truman's Hawkworld comic, pencilling and inking it for 26 issues until late 1992. In 1992 he designed and co-created the Batman villain Bane. He also worked on many issues of Detective Comics, illustrating key parts of the KnightFall and KnightsEnd sagas featuring Azrael and Batman.

Graham Nolan also did freelance work for the Dungeons & Dragons game, including The Mines of Bloodstone (1986), Egg of the Phoenix (1987), The Endless Stair (1987), and The Complete Book of Villains (1994).

In 1998 he created and published his own comic book, Monster Island. Nolan tried to get a reformatted version into newspaper syndication but was told they no longer were buying adventure or "continuity" strips. King Features, instead offered him the art duties on their existing long-running medical soap opera strip, Rex Morgan, M.D. A couple months later he was offered the Sunday Phantom strip as well.

He left the Phantom strip in 2006 to work on other projects. He left Rex Morgan in 2013.

Since then Nolan has been busy writing and illustrating creator-owned projects like "Joe Frankenstein" for IDW, "Return to Monster Island" for Ominous Press as well as returning to Bane with Chuck Dixon for the 12-part series, "Bane: Conquest".

In 2009, he created the webcomic Sunshine State.

Bibliography

Moonstone Books
 The Phantom: The Graham Nolan Sundays Vol. 1
 The Phantom: The Graham Nolan Sundays Vol. 2
 The Phantom Annual #1

DC Comics
 Bane: Conquest #1–12 (2017–2018)
 Batman vol. 2 #23.4, 36 (2013–2015)
 Batman: Bane of the Demon (1998)
 The Batman Chronicles #8, 17, 19 (1997–1999)
 Batman & Spider-Man: New Age Dawning (1997)
 Batman: Vengeance of Bane (1993)
 Batman: Vengeance of Bane II The Redemption (1995)
 Detective Comics #0, 650–653, 661–669, 671–678, 680–684, 687–688, 696–715, 717–718, 720–721 (1992–1998)
 Hawkworld #1–19, 21–26 (1990–1992)
 JLA Versus Predator with John Ostrander and Randy Elliott (2001)
 The Joker: Devil's Advocate (1996)
 Power of the Atom #7–18 (1988–1989)
 Superman: The Odyssey (1999)

Compass Comics
 Alien Alamo (2021)
 Monster Island (1998)
 The Chenoo (2020)

References

External links

The Phantom at King Features

Interview with Futureal Studio
Graham Nolan on Returning to Comics, Comic Book Resources, October 9, 2008
Sunshine State webcomic

 

1962 births
American comics artists
Artists from New York (state)
Inkpot Award winners
Living people
People from Long Beach, New York
Role-playing game artists
20th-century American artists
21st-century American artists